The 1924 Delaware gubernatorial election was held on November 4, 1924. Republican Governor William D. Denney declined to seek re-election, and the Republican state convention unanimously named banker Robert P. Robinson as its nominee; Robinson emerged as a compromise selection.

On the Democratic side, several candidates announced their candidacies prior to the convention and a difficult, protracted fight for the nomination developed. Joseph Bancroft, a prominent industrialist, and Josiah Marvel, emerged as the frontrunners. Bancroft won the nomination at the convention after nine ballots; an effort was made to nominate him by acclamation, but Marvel's supporters objected.

In the general election, Robinson defeated Bancroft by a wide margin, winning 59% of the vote to Bancroft's 40%. Robinson's landslide victory occurred as President Calvin Coolidge was overwhelmingly winning the state over his opponents, Democrat John W. Davis and Progressive Robert M. La Follette.

General election

References

Bibliography
 Delaware House Journal, 100th General Assembly, 1st Reg. Sess. (1925).

1924
Delaware
Gubernatorial
November 1924 events